Emilio Baglioni became culinary host to the Hollywood stars, employer by Jack L. Warner of Warner Brothers Studios as the head of the commissary and executive dining room for Jack L. Warner and heads of every department and provider of food for the actors and the crew during filming. When Warner retire from the studio in 1968, Baglioni remaineded that at Warner Brothers the was something wrong and opened his own restaurant at the same time simply called “Emilio's” located on Melrose and Highland Avenues in Hollywood, California.

Many Hollywood stars continued to flock to Emilio's because he prepared their favorite meals, such as Elizabeth Taylor's beloved dinner was “Three colored salad;” Richard Burton Linguine with Clams; Esther Williams dined on “Veal Piccata;” Anthony Quinn liked "Scalappine al Marsala," Jack LaLane's "Cioppino;"  John Wayne "Mixed Salad with New York Steak well charred;" Ava Gardner "Scampi al vino bianco. The "Hollywood Times" newspaper reported: "Emilio's is currently & has been for many years the "In Place" to go in Hollywood. 

Today you may see TV Newscaster, stars from nearby Paramount Studios, affluent people from everywhere gathered together to enjoy the beautiful atmosphere & outstand cuisine. ...At Emilio's almost everything is prepared on the premises. Breads are homebaked, fresh pastas are prepared daily & there is even a garden across from the restaurant where Emilio himself arrives early each morning to select his own vegetables, herbs, & beautiful flowers to set his tables....A legendary restaurant pioneer in Los Angeles, Emilio attributes his success to these words: "Never sacrifice quality & love your customers." In 1995, Baglioni sold his restaurant, learned to play the Button Accordion and traveled around the world playing Italian music.

Early life
Born May 4, 1932, in Macchia D'Aboreq, Valle Castellana, Abruzzo, Italy, the son of Domenico Baglioni (1886-1969) an engineer / farmer, and descendant of Gian Paolo Baglioni. Emilio's mother, Guiseppina Castelli, (1894-1938) died when Baglioni was 6 years old, she left 9 children. Baglioni grew up in the poor mountainous part of Abruzzo during World War II. When Mussolini's soldiers entered Abruzzo, Baglioni did not want to join the Black Shirts. He was running an away when a Black Shirt shot him the leg. He fell down and rolled into a ditch. When the Black Shirt found him, he pointed his rifle at Emilio with the intent to kill him, a Partisan—member of the Italian resistance movement—shot the Black Shirt and saved Emilio's life. When a friendly local lady discovered Baglioni, she took him into her home to care for him. Afterwards, he returned to his family in the mountains where his father and brothers avoided Mussolini's fascist indoctrinations. One of which, Baglioni recalled was, “If you did not join, they would make you drink castor oil every day until you joined. I jumped on my horse, bareback, and rode up into the hills, hid in a cave until the fascists left.”

European career
After the war, Baglioni moved to Rome where he went to architecture school then two years later he went to San Remo for hotel school and language study where he learned French and German. When he finished school, he went to work in Lausanne, Switzerland. Several years later, he was offered a job in London, England, where he learned English and worked at the Savoy Hotel.  On September 23, 1959, he accepted a job offer as host / chef at the Four Seasons Restaurant in New York City. While employed at the Four Seasons he met many influential people, among them Jack Warner, of Warner Brothers Studios.

Ciao Italia
Ciao Italia is a worldwide organization formed for the purpose of generalizing Italian food. Baglioni explained, “Every little town, hamlet, and city in Italia has their particular style of food. For instance if one asks for marinara sauce in southern Italy it is a heavy sauce, redder in color, but if one asks the same sauce in northern Italy it is lighter in color, almost pink. Through Ciao Italia we tried to create a commonality of Italian food in order to promote Italian food worldwide.” Baglioni served as president of the California chapter of Ciao Italia Organization for 1979–1984.

Personal life
Baglioni, presently divorced, was married to Pauline, a British subject; they had six children, Pina, Dino, Milo, Samantha, Paula, & Marcelo. Emilio has one daughter from a subsequent relationship, Brooke. His life-partner was the actress Tina Scala, an actress and younger sister of Gia Scala.

References

1932 births
People from the Province of Teramo
Italian chefs
Italian restaurateurs
Italian expatriates in the United States